Smash Hit is a first-person rail shooter developed by the Swedish indie game studio Mediocre, and released for iOS and Android smartphones.

Gameplay 
Smash Hit is an abstract rail shooter in which the player travels forward at a constant speed, with dynamic music that changes as the player progresses. The player has to shoot metal balls to destroy glass obstacles, but must aim carefully with a limited supply of ammunition; the game ends if it ever depletes.  Any collision with an obstacle results in the loss of a large amount of ammo, namely ten balls.  Obstacles can either be directly destroyed with the balls,  or otherwise moved out of the way by shooting a button.  Players can earn power-ups and activate them for a certain amount of time. Each power-up gives a special effect when activated, such as giving the player an infinite supply of balls, turning all their balls explosive, or slowing time down.

The key to survival and effective destruction of obstacles is a combo mechanic in which the player can destroy special crystals to regain a certain amount of ammunition; destroying a consecutive sequence of crystals will increase the player's rate of fire, allowing them to shoot as many as five balls at once, with each shot consuming only one ball from their ammo reserve despite multiple balls being shot.  Missing a crystal or taking damage ends the multiball streak and resets the player's rate of fire to just one ball.  Successful completion of the main campaign, which can be extremely difficult to accomplish for free as checkpoints require purchase of the full version, will unlock endless mode. in which the campaign's course is repeated ad infinitum until the player runs out of balls, challenging them to survive for as long as possible.
For every 0.1% through a checkpoint, 1 is added to the score. At the end of one checkpoint, the player will have gained 1,000 points.
The game repeats after 150 rooms/checkpoints, which is an extremely long time to play.

Mediocre has also released a version of the game for Samsung Gear VR titled Smash Hit VR.

Reception 
Smash Hit received mostly positive reviews. Common Sense Media gave the game 5 out of 5 praising it as "a therapeutic experience", and "utterly hypnotizing".

References

External links 
 Official website

2014 video games
Indie video games
Android (operating system) games
IOS games
Samsung Gear VR games
Video games developed in Sweden
Lua (programming language)-scripted video games
Multiplayer and single-player video games